Mihály Csutorás (7 March 1912 − 7 April 1956) was a Hungarian international football player. He played for the club Herminamezei AC. He participated with the Hungary national football team at the 1936 Summer Olympics in Berlin.

References

External links

1912 births
1956 deaths
Footballers at the 1936 Summer Olympics
Olympic footballers of Hungary
Hungarian footballers
Association football midfielders